better known as  is a Japanese folk singer and anime song singer who has performed on the soundtracks of various anime and tokusatsu series and movies. He is perhaps best known as the vocalist for the theme songs for Battle Fever J, Dai Sentai Goggle V, Kagaku Sentai Dynaman, Albegas, and performed image songs for various series. He also sang the theme song of the fictional character Segata Sanshiro (played by Hiroshi Fujioka) who appeared in Sega's commercials between 1997 and 1998 to advertise the Sega Saturn in Japan.

External links 
 Mojo web – Official website 

1952 births
Japanese male singers
Living people
Musicians from Chiba Prefecture
Anime musicians